Blackwater in a sanitation context denotes wastewater from toilets which likely contains pathogens that may spread by the fecal–oral route. Blackwater can contain feces, urine, water and toilet paper from flush toilets. Blackwater is distinguished from greywater, which comes from sinks, baths, washing machines, and other kitchen appliances apart from toilets.  Greywater results from washing food, clothing, dishes, as well as from showering or bathing.

Blackwater and greywater are kept separate in "ecological buildings", such as autonomous buildings. Recreational vehicles often have separate holding tanks for greywater from showers and sinks, and blackwater from the toilet.

Definition
According to one source:

Water coming from domestic equipment other than toilets (e.g., bathtubs, showers, sinks, washing machines) is called greywater. In some sanitation systems, it is preferred to keep the greywater separate from blackwater to reduce the amount of water that gets heavily polluted and to simplify treatment methods for the greywater.

Terminology 
Blackwater is a term dating to at least the 1970s and, in Hong Kong regional usage, an alternative term for blackwater is "soil water".

Treatment processes
Blackwater contains pathogens that must decompose before they can be released safely into the environment.  It is difficult to process blackwater if it contains a large quantity of excess water, or if it must be processed quickly, because of the high concentrations of organic material.

Composting 
However, if blackwater does not contain excess water, or if it receives primary treatment to de-water, then it is easily processed through composting.

Blackwater generation can be avoided by making use of composting toilets and vermifilter toilets. In certain autonomous buildings, such as earthships, this is almost always present and allows the water requirements of the building (which, with earthships, are self-generated) to be heavily reduced. Besides saving water, composting toilets allow the user to reuse the nutrients found therein (e.g., for growing crops/trees).

See also
 Algae fuel
 Container-based sanitation
 Constructed wetland
 Ecological sanitation
 Night soil

References 

Sanitation
Sewerage
Water pollution